Seventy-five ant species have been recorded in Andorra, a small landlocked country located in the heart of the Pyrenees and bordered by Spain and France. The ant fauna of Andorra is mostly dominated by Central European species (some are typical cold climate specialists); however species belonging to the Mediterranean ant fauna are also found. This can be explained by the particular geographic situation of Andorra which is characterized by a high mountain Mediterranean climate.

With 75 species recorded, the ant fauna of Andorra can be considered as highly diverse, especially considering the size of the country. The species are distributed across 21 genera belonging to 4 subfamilies (Dolichoderinae, Formicinae, Myrmicinae, Ponerinae). The most speciose subfamily was Myrmicinae and the most speciose genus was Formica with 36 and 14 species respectively. The number of ant species collected represents more than one third of the number of species found in France (213) species and about a quarter of the total number of species recorded in the Iberian Peninsula (299 species).  When considered at the scale of the Pyrenees, Andorra contains about 88% of the ant species recorded in these mountains above an altitude of 1,000 m (about 85 species).

This checklist is based on Bernadou et al. (2013), who notes that the total number of species could actually be somewhat higher. Very few parasitic species are recorded and they could probably be found with a higher sampling effort, and based on what is known from the ant fauna of France and Spain, some genera can be expected to be richer (e.g. Temnothorax, Camponotus).

Species

See also

Notes

References

Checklist references

 A:  
 B:  
 C:  
 D:  
 E:  
 F:  
 G:  
 H:  
 I:  
 J:  
 K:  
 L:  
 M:  
 N:  

Andorra
Ants
Andorra, ants
Andorra
Ants